
Gmina Korytnica is a rural gmina (administrative district) in Węgrów County, Masovian Voivodeship, in east-central Poland. Its seat is the village of Korytnica, which lies approximately 11 kilometres (7 mi) west of Węgrów and 60 km (37 mi) north-east of Warsaw.

Villages
Gmina Korytnica contains the villages and settlements of Adampol, Bednarze, Chmielew, Czaple, Dąbrowa, Decie, Górki Borze, Górki Grubaki, Górki Średnie, Jaczew, Jugi, Kąty, Komory, Korytnica, Kruszew, Kupce, Leśniki, Lipniki, Maksymilianów, Nojszew, Nowy Świętochów, Paplin, Pniewnik, Połazie Świętochowskie, Rabiany, Rąbież, Roguszyn, Rowiska, Sekłak, Sewerynów, Stary Świętochów, Szczurów, Trawy, Turna, Wielądki, Wola Korytnicka, Wypychy, Żabokliki, Zakrzew, Zalesie and Żelazów.

Neighbouring gminas
Gmina Korytnica is bordered by the gminas of Dobre, Jadów, Liw, Łochów, Sadowne, Stoczek, Strachówka and Wierzbno.

References

Polish official population figures 2006

Korytnica
Węgrów County